École élémentaire Marie-Curie, previously known as London French School and École Alexandra, is a public French first language elementary school in London, Ontario, Canada. It is located on Hunt Club Drive off Oxford Street West in the north-western neighbourhood of Oakridge. London has a very small francophone population, but became eligible for French learning institutions when the Government of Ontario amended the Education Act in 1968 to officially recognize French language schools in the province.

Marie Curie opened in 1972 under the name of "London French School" and was located downtown on King Street. It was soon renamed "École Alexandra" after Princess Alexandra. It was the first French language school in London and initially taught kindergarten to eighth grade. The school moved to its current Hunt Club Drive location for the 1981-1982 school year and the aging older building was demolished. As the first French school in London, it became popularly and informally known simply as "École".  

In the early 1990s the then principal, Jean-Claude Imbeault, made a number of changes to the school. He had the school renamed to "École élémentaire Marie-Curie" after the Polish-French physicist Marie Curie. He changed the school colours from blue and white to black, silver and white. The school was also given new logo and the motto "Savoir faire et bien faire". Most significantly, he created a plan for a multicultural school population.

From 1979 until 1999, graduating students from Alexandra/Marie Curie who wanted to continue their French studies went to London Central Secondary School. Central, an English school, was the host to the Module scolaire de langue française (MSLF) – the first French first language public high school in London. Only one course was initially offered, but quickly grew to include many subjects.

The French high school program eventually outgrew Central Secondary School. For the start of the 1999-2000 school year, the MSLF moved from Central into the same building as the French Catholic Secondary School and became École secondaire Gabriel-Dumont. The seventh and eighth grade from Marie-Curie was moved to Gabriel-Dumont during the relocation. 

Today, École élémentaire Marie-Curie teaches junior kindergarten to the sixth grade and is one of five French schools in London (two public schools and three catholic schools). There are also two French high schools and a French community centre.

Notable alumni
Notable alumni include:
 Jeffrey Buttle, figure skater
 Jordan Prentice, actor

See also
École secondaire Gabriel-Dumont
List of schools in London, Ontario

External links
École élémentaire Marie-Curie (in French)
L'Association canadienne-française de l'Ontario (ACFO) (in French)
ACFO-London-Sarnia (in French)

Educational institutions established in 1972
Elementary schools in London, Ontario
French-language elementary schools in Ontario